The 2014 Men's U23 African Volleyball Championship will be held in Sharm el-Sheikh, Egypt from 7 to 12 November 2014. The top two teams will qualify for the 2015 FIVB Volleyball Men's U23 World Championship.

Teams
The teams are.

Round robin

|}

|}

Final standing

Team Roster
Ahmed Guenichi, Khaled Ben Slimene, Oussema Mrika, Mahmoud Chaouch Bouraoui, Malek Chekir, Elyes Garfi, Adem Oueslati, Mohamed Amine Htira, Wassim Ben Tara, Mohamed Brahem, Karim Messelmeni, Tayeb Korbosli
Head Coach: Riadh Hedhili

Awards
MVP:  Elyes Garfi
Best Spiker:  Adem Oueslati
Best Blocker:  Mohamed Adel
Best Server:  Ahmed Said
Best Libero:  Peter Bigirimana
Best Setter:  Khaled Ben Slimene
Best Receiver:  Larbi Hedroug

See also
2014 Women's U23 African Volleyball Championship

References

External links
Official website

U23
2014 in Egyptian sport
International volleyball competitions hosted by Egypt
2014 in volleyball